Calvin Oscar Hultman (May 24, 1941 – October 19, 2017) was an American politician in the state of Iowa.

Hultman was born in Omaha, Nebraska and attended Iowa State University and Dana College. He lived in Stanton, Iowa (1941–1971), Red Oak, Iowa (1971–1991), Des Moines, Iowa (1991–2014) and McKinney, Texas until the time of his death. He spent his summers in Moose, Wyoming and later had a summer home in Dubois, Wyoming. Hultman was in the retail and lumber business, as well as realty, and became a lobbyist after he retired from the state Senate. Hultman served in the Iowa Senate from 1973 to 1991, as a Republican. He died of cancer in McKinney, Texas in 2017.

References

1941 births
2017 deaths
Republican Party Iowa state senators
Dana College alumni
Iowa State University alumni
Politicians from Omaha, Nebraska
People from McKinney, Texas
People from Red Oak, Iowa
Businesspeople from Iowa
Deaths from cancer in Texas
People from Montgomery County, Illinois
People from Moose, Wyoming
20th-century American businesspeople